Astrobunus is a genus of harvestmen in the family Sclerosomatidae from Europe.

Species
 Astrobunus bavaricus Rower, 1957
 Astrobunus bernardinus Simon, 1879
 Astrobunus dinaricus Roewer, 1915
 Astrobunus glockneri Roewer, 1957
 Astrobunus grallator Simon, 1879
 Astrobunus helleri (Ausserer, 1867)
 Astrobunus kochi Thorell, 1876
 Astrobunus laevipes (Canestrini, 1872)
 Astrobunus scoticus Roewer, 1957
 Astrobunus spinosus (Herbst, 1799)
 Astrobunus osellai C. Chemini, 1986
 Astrobunus roeweri Hadzi, 1927

References

Harvestman genera